Mount Nebo is a mountain located in the Catskill Mountains of New York northeast of Windham. Mount Hayden is located southeast, and Mount Pisgah is located northwest of Mount Nebo.

References

Nebo
Nebo